The women's 1000 meter at the 2023 KNSB Dutch Single Distance Championships in Heerenveen took place at Thialf ice skating rink on Sunday 5 February 2023. There were 20 participants. Jutta Leerdam, Antoinette Rijpma-de Jong, and Michelle de Jong qualified for the 2023 ISU World Speed Skating Championships in Heerenveen.

Statistics

Result

Referee: Loretta Staring. Assistant: Miriam Kuiper. Starter: Marco Hesselink 

Source:

Draw

References

Single Distance Championships
2023 Single Distance
World